Becks Mill is an unincorporated community in Howard Township, Washington County, in the U.S. state of Indiana.

History
Beck's Mill, the first gristmill in the county, was built by George Beck in 1808.

A post office was established at Becks Mill in 1858, and remained in operation until it was discontinued in 1900.

Geography

References

Unincorporated communities in Washington County, Indiana
Unincorporated communities in Indiana